The 1956 Texas A&M Aggies football team represented Texas A&M University in the 1956 NCAA University Division football season. The team won the Southwest Conference and compiled an overall record of 9–0–1, including a 6–0 record in conference play. However, the Aggies were on probation and not allowed to play in a bowl game. The team was coached by Paul "Bear" Bryant.

Schedule

References

Texas
Texas A&M Aggies football seasons
Southwest Conference football champion seasons
College football undefeated seasons
Texas AandM Aggies football